"Sere nere" is the second single from Italian singer Tiziano Ferro's second studio album, 111 Centoundici (2003).

A Spanish version of the song, entitled "Tardes negras", was also released, which charted at number 14 on the U.S. Billboard Hot Latin Songs. 

Ferro performed the song at the MTV Europe Music Awards 2004, where he won in the Best Italian Act category. The music video for the single was filmed in Trieste, Italy.

Charts

Weekly charts

Year-end charts

Certifications

References

2000s ballads
2003 songs
2004 singles
Pop ballads
Songs written by Tiziano Ferro
Tiziano Ferro songs